Apitong may refer to:

Apitong, Boac, a barangay of Boac, Marinduque, Philippines
A barangay of Naujan, Oriental Mindoro, Philippines
Barangay 92 of Tacloban City, Philippines
Wood of the Dipterocarpus grandiflorus tree
A character in the Philippine fantasy-themed television series Encantadia